Kielder is a small, remote village in western Northumberland, England. Located at the head of Kielder Water and in the north west of Kielder Forest, the village is within  of the Scottish border.

History
There was early settlement around Kielder Castle, a hunting lodge built by the Duke of Northumberland in 1775. Previous settlements were expanded in the 1950s by the Forestry Commission who constructed housing to accommodate the workers employed in the planting of Kielder Forest. Most of this housing has now been sold back to the private sector.

Governance 
Kielder is in the parliamentary constituency of Hexham. Until 1 April 2009 it was within Tynedale local government district, but following local government restructuring in Northumberland the county is now covered by a unitary authority, Northumberland County Council.

Geography 
It is claimed that Kielder has the lowest level of light pollution in England – hence the construction nearby of Kielder Observatory.

Climate

As with most low-lying locations in the British Isles, Kielder experiences a maritime climate with cool summers and mild winters. There is a Met Office weather station at Kielder Castle. This record high temperature broke the previous record high by more than 5 °C (9 °F).

Demography 
The population of Kielder in 2001 was 207.

Economy 
The economy of Kielder has relied on forestry but now also incorporates tourism.  Prior to the 20th century the economy of Kielder revolved around sheep farming. The use of the area as a hunting ground by the Dukes of Northumberland added an extra element to the area. Due to its location close to the border with Scotland, there was a black economy concerned with the smuggling of whisky from Scotland to England.

Forestry 
The Forestry Act 1919 established the Forestry Commission with a purpose of forming a strategic reserve of timber for the country.  The first plantings at Kielder were in 1926 when  of coniferous trees were planted. A further  were purchased in 1932 and today  of forest are under Forestry Commission control.

Although timber production remains an integral part of the forestry operation, it also has the aims of encouraging the public to use the forest as an educational resource and to sustain and enhance wildlife conservation. Over 50% of the red squirrel population of England is now found in the forest.

Tourism 
With the creation of Kielder Water in 1982 great strides have been taken to develop the area as a tourist destination with the establishment of facilities such as Leaplish Waterside Park by Northumbrian Water, which offers both accommodation and recreational facilities, the Kielder Observatory and various artworks in the landscape, such as the Kielder Skyspace.

Transport 
Kielder was served by Kielder railway station on the Border Counties Railway which linked the Newcastle and Carlisle Railway, near Hexham, with the Border Union Railway at Riccarton Junction. The first section of the route was opened between Hexham and Chollerford in 1858, the remainder opening in 1862. The line was closed to passengers by British Railways in 1956.

The station building, now a private house, still stands here by the 'Station Garage'. The station was renamed Kielder Forest in 1948. The Kielder Reservoir now floods much of the route eastwards to Falstone, but a very fine castellated viaduct near Kielder Castle still stands. Slightly further east its course would be below today's water level.

Education 
The village is served by Kielder Community First School.  In the academic year 2009–10 this has a roll of nine pupils aged 4 to 9. Children aged 9 to 13 attend Bellingham Middle School and from 13 to 18, Haydon Bridge High School. As the high school is a considerable distance away the option to board at the school exists.

Religious sites 
Kielder lies within the Anglican parish of Falstone with Greystead & Thorneyburn.

Public services 
Within the village there is a pub and a post office.

Notes

External links

Northumberland Communities (Accessed: 11 March 2009)

Villages in Northumberland